The 1965–66 Alpha Ethniki was the 30th season of the highest football league of Greece. The season began on 28 November 1965 and ended on 19 June 1966. Olympiacos won their 16th Greek title and their first in seven years.

The point system was: Win: 3 points - Draw: 2 points - Loss: 1 point.

League table

Results

Top scorers

External links
Greek Wikipedia
Official Greek FA Site
Greek SuperLeague official Site
SuperLeague Statistics

Alpha Ethniki seasons
Greece
1965–66 in Greek football leagues